Norrbotten County held a county council election on 14 September 2014, on the same day as the general and municipal elections.

Results
The number of seats remained at 71 with the Social Democrats winning the most at 27, a loss of six seats from 2010. The Social Democrats received 36.9% of the votes with the Health Care Party coming second at 25.3%, making sizeable inroads to the historically dominant party in the county and were the largest party in four municipalities. There were 165,017 valid ballots cast for a turnout of 82.8%.

Municipalities

Images

References

Elections in Norrbotten County
Norrbotten